Tân Lợi may refer to several places in Vietnam, including:

Tân Lợi, An Giang, a commune of Tịnh Biên District in An Giang Province
Tân Lợi, a commune of Đồng Hỷ District in Thái Nguyên Province
Tân Lợi, Hớn Quản, a commune of Hớn Quản District in Bình Phước Province